Oak Creek is a city in the U.S. state of Wisconsin. Located in Milwaukee County, it sits on the southwestern shore of Lake Michigan and is located immediately south of Milwaukee. The city is one of the fastest growing in Milwaukee County and all of Wisconsin. As of the 2020 census, the population was 36,497.

The area has experienced an economic boom in recent years, with the addition of large companies such as Amazon, IKEA, and the Astronautics Corporation of America.

History
On January 2, 1838, the territorial legislature divided Milwaukee County into two towns: the Town of Milwaukee, encompassing everything north of the present Greenfield Avenue, and the Town of Lake encompassing everything south of the present Greenfield Avenue; "and the polls of election shall be opened at the house of Elisha Higgins, in said town." On March 8, 1839, a new Town of Kinnikennick was created, encompassing the western part of Lake (later the Towns of Greenfield and Franklin); final

Y, on August 13, 1840, the south portion of the Town of Lake was split off to form the town of Oak Creek. As of the 1840 census, the population of the Town of Lake (then including Oak Creek) was 418.

In 1955 (JOBS), the Town of Oak Creek, then still semi-rural with a population of 4807 in the 1950 census, was incorporated as a city under the terms of Wisconsin statute 66.0215, also known as "The Oak Creek Law." The Oak Creek Law was crafted by Town Attorney Tony Basile to prevent Oak Creek's annexation by the City of Milwaukee, which by annexations (including the 1954 annexation of the remainder of the Town of Lake) was now bordering Oak Creek and had already annexed one small portion of the town; the law was shepherded through the legislature with the help of state Democratic party legislative joint committee chairman Leland McParland, who was the state senator for Oak Creek.

In recent years, the 85 acre site called the Drexel Town Square, built on part of the site where the gigantic AC Spark Plug factory once stood, has become the city's newest economic venture. It is home to a number of retail shops, restaurants, a hotel, residential buildings, and a medical facility. The Civic Center includes city hall and the public library. The town square also features a farmers market, splash pad, ice rink, and an outdoor amphitheater. The town square development won the 2016 Vision Award from the Milwaukee Business Journal.

On August 5, 2012, a white supremacist opened fire at a Sikh temple in Oak Creek. The white supremacist killed six people and injured several more before being killed by Oak Creek Police.

Geography
Oak Creek is located at  (42.884347, −87.899209).

It is part of the Milwaukee metropolitan area and borders the cities of Milwaukee and Greenfield to the north, the city of South Milwaukee to the north and east, Lake Michigan to the east, the village of Caledonia to the south, the city of Franklin and the village of Greendale to the west.

A  small section of the Root River flows north from Racine County through Oak Creek at its southern edge at the Root River Parkway. Additionally, the Oak Creek watershed originates in the city of Franklin and meanders through to Grant Park in South Milwaukee, and ultimately into Lake Michigan. The stream drains about 26 square miles.

Demographics

2000 census
At the 2000 census, there were 28,456 people, 11,239 households and 7,530 families. The population density was 994.4 per square mile (383.9/km2). There were 11,897 housing units at an average density of 415.7 per square mile (160.5/km2). The ethnic makeup was 91.96% White, 1.82% African American, 0.59% Native American, 2.39% Asian, 1.70% from other ethnic groups, and 1.53% from two or more ethnic groups. Hispanic or Latino of any race were 4.45% of the population.

There were 11,239 households, of which 33.3% had children under the age of 18 living with them, 56.4% were married couples living together, 7.1% had a female householder with no husband present, and 33.0% were non-families. Of all households, 25.3% were made up of individuals, and 7.0% had someone living alone who was 65 years of age or older. The average household size was 2.52 and the average family size was 3.10.

25.0% of the population were under the age of 18, 9.3% from 18 to 24, 35.4% from 25 to 44, 21.5% from 45 to 64, and 8.9% who were 65 years of age or older. The median age was 34 years. For every 100 females, there were 99.3 males. For every 100 females age 18 and over, there were 97.9 males.

The median household income was $53,779 and the median family income was $63,381. Males had a median income of $43,935 and females $31,443. The per capita income was $23,586. About 1.2% of families and 3.1% of the population were below the poverty line, including 2.2% of those under age 18 and 6.7% of those age 65 or over.

2010 census
At the 2010 census, there were 34,451 people, 14,064 households and 9,077 families residing in the city. The racial makeup was 87.7% White, 2.8% African American, 0.7% Native American, 4.5% Asian, 2.1% from other races, and 2.1% from two or more races. Hispanic or Latino of any race were 7.5% of the population.

There were 14,064 households, of which 32.1% had children under the age of 18 living with them, 52.3% were married couples living together, 8.2% had a female householder with no husband present, 4.0% had a male householder with no wife present, and 35.5% were non-families. Of all households, 28.6% were made up of individuals, and 9.2% had someone living alone who was 65 years of age or older. The average household size was 2.44 and the average family size was 3.06.

The median age was 37.4 years. 23.6% of residents were under the age of 18; 8.1% were between the ages of 18 and 24; 29.8% were from 25 to 44; 27.4% were from 45 to 64; and 11% were 65 years of age or older. The gender makeup was 49.1% male and 50.9% female.

Economy

Midwest Airlines's headquarters were located in Oak Creek. In January 2010 Republic Airways, the parent company of Midwest, announced that it would move all Republic executives, including Midwest Airlines executives, to Indianapolis, Indiana.

Mining equipment manufacturer Bucyrus International announced June 22, 2010 that it would move headquarters personnel from South Milwaukee to Midwest Airlines' former headquarters space in Oak Creek. Senior management and other personnel would be moving to the new location making room for additional employees at its South Milwaukee facility. Caterpillar Inc. intends to locate the Caterpillar Mining world headquarters there after its acquisition of Bucyrus International.

The Oak Creek Power Plant is in Oak Creek. The city also hosts a number of small companies, with interests ranging from engineering to agriculture, including the locally-famous Black Bear Bottling plant.

The American Society of Anesthesia Technologists & Technicians is also based in Oak Creek.

In May 2018, the first IKEA in Wisconsin opened its doors in Oak Creek. It is a 290,000-square foot site located directly off of I-94.

Arts and culture

The Oak Creek Historical Society is a private organization established in 1964 to preserve the history of Oak Creek. The organization maintains a museum complex consisting of five historic buildings and a gift shop, on the grounds of Forest Hill Memorial Park in Oak Creek.

 Blacksmith Shop: Edgar Wohlust's blacksmith shop was one of only eight in the area. It was built in 1886 and moved to the grounds in 1970.
 Farm Shed: Moved in 1984, it contains farm equipment from the 1830s up to the 1950s.
 Hughes Cabin: Built in the 1840s with an addition in the 1920s, it is one of the oldest buildings still standing in Milwaukee County.
 Summer Kitchen: Moved from the Franke Farm in 1974, this summer kitchen was constructed in 1890.
 Town Hall: The Oak Creek Town Hall, built in 1874, was used until 1963.

Government

At the federal level, Oak Creek is located in Wisconsin's 1st congressional district, represented by Republican Bryan Steil.

Education
Oak Creek is part of the Oak Creek Franklin School District.

Elementary schools
Carollton Elementary: built 1962
Cedar Hills Elementary: built 1962
Deerfield Elementary: built 2005
Edgewood Elementary: built 1962
Forest Ridge Elementary: built 2016
Meadowview Elementary: built 1959
Shepard Hills Elementary: built 1971
Early Learning Academy

Middle schools
East Middle School: built 1965, torn down and rebuilt 2008
West Middle School: built 1991
Empower Academy

High schools
9th Grade Center: built 2017
Oak Creek High School: built 1962 and renovated 2002

Private schools
Grace Lutheran Church and School
Saint Matthew Catholic School

Infrastructure

Transportation and transit
According to Walk Score, Oak Creek is a largely "car dependent" city, with an overall walk score of 21/100 and it has "minimal biking infrastructure", with an overall bike score of 40/100.

Oak Creek is serviced by the Milwaukee County Transit System routes 40, 80, 219 and the PurpleLine.

The city shares a border with General Mitchell International Airport in Milwaukee. In the metro Milwaukee area, three Class 1 railroads deliver freight. For passenger transport, Amtrak’s Hiawatha service connects General Mitchell International Airport to the heart of Chicago.

Healthcare
The Froedtert Drexel Town Square Health Center and Aurora Health Center are located in Oak Creek and provide urgent care. Ascension SE Wisconsin Hospital is located in neighboring Franklin.

Public safety
The Oak Creek Police Department is responsible for the city's law enforcement since September 11, 1956.

Notable people

 Brian Calhoun, Oak Creek high school athletic star, was on the 2006–2008 Detroit Lions of the National Football League
 Adin P. Hobart, Wisconsin State Representative and Postmaster of Oak Creek
 Mark Honadel, welder, businessman and state representative; grew up in Oak Creek and graduated from OCHS
 John Matuszak, National Football League player and actor, born and grew up in Oak Creek
 John Ruan, Irish-born pioneer farmer who served in the Wisconsin State Assembly, on the town board of Oak Creek, and as superintendent of schools for Milwaukee County
 Luke Scanlan, Wisconsin State Representative and chairman of the Oak Creek Town Board, lived in Oak Creek
 Cathy Stepp, businesswoman, member of the Wisconsin State Assembly, and Secretary of the Wisconsin Department of Natural Resources; graduated from OCHS
 William M. Williams Jr., Wisconsin State Representative and Postmaster of Oak Creek

References

External links
 City of Oak Creek
 Oak Creek Historical Society website
 

Cities in Wisconsin
Cities in Milwaukee County, Wisconsin
Wisconsin populated places on Lake Michigan